Asclepias syriaca, commonly called common milkweed, butterfly flower, silkweed, silky swallow-wort, and Virginia silkweed, is a species of flowering plant. It is native to southern Canada and much of the United States east of the Rocky Mountains, excluding the drier parts of the prairies. It is in the genus Asclepias, the milkweeds. It grows in sandy soils as well as other kinds of soils in sunny areas.

Description
Individual plants grow from rhizomes. All parts of common milkweed plants produce a white latex when cut. The simple leaves are opposite, sometimes whorled; broadly ovate-lanceolate. They have very short petioles and velvety undersides.

The highly fragrant, nectariferous flowers vary from white (rarely) through pinkish and purplish and occur in umbellate cymes. The seeds, each with long, white flossy hairs, occur in large follicles. Fruit production from self-fertilization is rare. In three study plots, outcrossed flowers had an average of about 11% fruit set.

Ecology 
More than 450 insect species feed on A. syriaca, including flies, beetles, ants, bees, wasps, and butterflies; it is an important food source for monarch butterfly caterpillars (Danaus plexippus); other species that feed on the plant include red milkweed beetle (Tetraopes tetraophthalmus), the milkweed tussock caterpillar (Euchaetes egle) and Oncopeltus fasciatus and Lygaeus kalmii. Many kinds of insects visit A. syriaca flowers, and some kinds pollinate them, including Apis mellifera, the Western honey bee, and native Bombus spp. (bumblebees). In the U.S. mid-Atlantic region, the introduced species A. mellifera was found to be the most "effective" pollinator, but this occurs more often among flowers of the same plant; since  A. syriaca has a high level of self-incompatibility, it is less effective than  'Bombus spp. in the fertilization of flowers because Bombus spp. are more likely to visit unrelated individuals.

Monarch butterfly larvae consume only milkweeds, and monarch populations may decline when milkweeds are eliminated with herbicides. The development and widely adopted cultivation of herbicide-resistant staple crops such as corn and soybeans have led to a massive reduction in weeds and native plants such as milkweeds. Subsequently, this has played a significant part in the population decline of the monarch butterfly. In 2018 the CEO of the National Wildlife Federation stated that the population of the monarch butterfly is now down 90 percent in the last 20 years and cited the reduction in milkweed as a contributing factor.

Many parts of the United States face a reduction in milkweed population due to factors such as increased habitat loss due to development, roadside median mowing, and herbicide use. Despite this, deforestation due to human settlement may have expanded the range and density of common milkweed in some regions. Milkweed has even become invasive as it is naturalized in several areas outside of its original native range, including Oregon and some parts of Europe.

Over 40 distinct pathogens of Asclepias species have been identified, including two dozen pathogens for A. syriaca. For example, milkweed yellows is an infectious disease caused by the milkweed yellows phytoplasma, a strain of bacteria distinguished by the absence of a cell wall.

The species features since 2017 on the list of Invasive Alien Species of Union Concern. This means that import of the species and trade in the species is forbidden in the whole of the European Union.

Cultivation

A. syriaca can become invasive. It spreads aggressively from rhizomes and may not be suited to small gardens and formalized plantings. The plant is winter hardy in USDA zones 3–9; it has a preference for moist but well drained soils, but is tolerant of dry conditions and clay soils. It is ideal in semi-dry places where it can spread without presenting problems for other ornamental species.

Monarch Watch provides information on rearing monarchs and their host plants. Efforts to restore falling monarch butterfly populations by establishing butterfly gardens and monarch migratory "waystations" require particular attention to the target species' food preferences and population cycles, as well to the conditions needed to propagate and maintain their food plants.

In the northeastern United States, monarch reproduction peaks in late summer when most of the plant's leaves are old and tough. Plants that are mowed or cut back in June – August regrow rapidly from their rhizomes in time for peak monarch egg-laying, when reproducing female monarchs have a preference for quickly-growing A. syriaca shoots whose foliage is tender and soft.

A. syriaca is easily propagated by both seed and rhizome cuttings. The plant's seeds require a period of cold treatment (cold stratification) before they will germinate.

To protect seeds from washing away during heavy rains and from seed–eating birds, one can cover the seeds with a light fabric or with an  layer of straw mulch. However, mulch acts as an insulator. Thicker layers of mulch can prevent seeds from germinating if they prevent soil temperatures from rising enough when winter ends. Further, few seedlings can push through a thick layer of mulch. Both seedlings and cuttings will usually bloom in their second year, although cuttings will occasionally bloom during their first year.

The nonnative Aphis nerii (oleander aphid) can become abundant on milkweed shoots.

Uses 
The plant's latex contains large quantities of cardiac glycosides, making the leaves and stems of old tall plants toxic to humans and large animals. The young shoots, young leaves, flower buds and immature fruits are all edible raw.

Euell Gibbons, the author of Stalking the Wild Asparagus (1962), wrote that milkweed is bitter and toxic.  However, he may have inadvertently prepared common dogbane (Apocynum cannabinum), a poisonous somewhat similar-looking plant instead. Gibbons devised a method to remove the bitterness and toxicity by plunging the young shoots into boiling water and cooking for one minute, repeating the procedure at least three times to make the plant safe to eat. Some modern foragers consider the bitterness and toxicity issue a myth. The plants have no bitterness when tasted raw, and can be cooked like asparagus, with no special processing.

Failed attempts have been made to exploit rubber (from the latex) and fiber (from seeds' "floss") production from the plant industrially. The fluffy seed hairs have been used as the traditional background for mounted butterflies and other insects. The compressed floss has a silk-like sheen. The plant has also been explored for commercial use of its bast (inner bark) fiber, which is both strong and soft. U. S. Department of Agriculture studies in the 1890s and 1940s found that common milkweed has more potential for commercial processing than any other indigenous bast fiber plant, with estimated yields as high as hemp and quality as good as flax. Both the bast fiber and the floss were used historically by Native Americans for cordage and textiles. Milkweed has also been cultivated commercially to be used as insulation in winter coats.

Traditionally, in both North America and Europe, the plant was used to treat respiratory infections such as pleurisy.

Genomics 
The genome of A. syriaca has been sequenced. Genomic analysis of several hundred A. syriaca isolates from throughout the natural range in eastern North America showed that this species is a single panmictic population that experienced expansions about 12,000 years ago, after the recession of North American glaciers, and more recently, about 200 years ago, during clearing of forests for agriculture in the eastern United States.

Gallery

Notes

References

External links

syriaca
Butterfly food plants
Flora of North America
Plants described in 1753
Taxa named by Carl Linnaeus
Apocynaceae